Aleimma loeflingiana is a moth of the family Tortricidae. It is found in Europe and the Near East.

The wingspan is .The forewings are narrowed anteriorly, whitish-ochreous or pale ochreous, more or less darker-strigulated, sometimes partially suffused with brown. The antemedian and central fasciae are outlined with fuscous or dark fuscous towards the costa and sometimes throughout, sometimes partly or wholly brown. The cilia are whitish-ochreous, the base dark fuscous. The hindwings are grey. The larva is pale green; spots, head, and plate of 2 black. Julius von Kennel provides a full description.

The moth flies from June to August from dusk.

The larvae feed on Carpinus betulus, oak and maple.

References

External links 

 Aleimma loeflingiana at waarneming.nl 
 Lepidoptera of Belgium at University of Antwerp
 Aleimma loeflingiana at UK Moths

Moths described in 1758
Taxa named by Carl Linnaeus
Tortricidae of Europe
Moths of Asia
Tortricini